is a member of the House of Councillors and a member of the Japanese Communist Party. He was elected to his position in the National Diet in 2013. Tatsumi is opposed to the MagLev system, saying that it is a waste of resources.

References

External links 
 Homepage (in Japanese)
 House of Councillors Website Member Information (in English)

1976 births
Living people
Japanese communists
Japanese Communist Party politicians